Jantsangiin Gantögs (Mongolian: Жанцангийн Гантөгс; born 12 April 1972 in Moscow, Soviet Union) is a Mongolian archer. He competed in the individual event at the 2012 Summer Olympics.

References

External links
 

Mongolian male archers
1972 births
Living people
Archers at the 2012 Summer Olympics
Archers at the 2016 Summer Olympics
Olympic archers of Mongolia
Archers at the 1994 Asian Games
Archers at the 2002 Asian Games
Archers at the 2006 Asian Games
Archers at the 2010 Asian Games
Archers at the 2014 Asian Games
Archers at the 2018 Asian Games
Asian Games competitors for Mongolia